"Single Women" is a song, written by Saturday Night Live writer Michael O'Donoghue. The song, was originally performed during an SNL sketch by Christine Ebersole on the October 10, 1981 broadcast, and was later recorded by Dolly Parton for her 1982 Heartbreak Express album. Released as the album's first single in February 1982, it reached number 8 on the U.S. country singles chart in April 1982. The Parton version of the song featured somewhat reworked lyrics, as RCA requested she eliminate the drug references, fearful that they would cause the song to meet resistance on country radio.  

The song later inspired a 1984 TV movie titled Single Bars, Single Women, starring Shelley Hack, Paul Michael Glaser, Mare Winningham, and Tony Danza, which was produced by O'Donoghue. An abbreviated version of Parton's recording of the song was used as the movie's theme song.

Content
The song depicts a number of women looking for love in a singles bar.

Charts

References

External links
Single Women lyrics at Dolly Parton On-Line

Dolly Parton songs
RCA Records singles
Works by Michael O'Donoghue
1981 songs
1982 singles